This uniform polyhedron compound is a composition of 2 great dodecahedra, in the same arrangement as in the compound of 2 icosahedra.

It is one of only five polyhedral compounds (along with the compound of six tetrahedra, the compound of five great dodecahedra, the compound of two small stellated dodecahedra, and the compound of five small stellated dodecahedra) which is vertex-transitive and face-transitive but not edge-transitive.

References 
.

External links 
 VRML model: 

Polyhedral compounds